The Bridge Peer Counseling Center (usually referred to as simply The Bridge) is a student-run 24-hour peer-counseling center at Stanford University that offers free confidential counseling and a comprehensive information and referral service. It primarily serves the undergraduate and graduate student communities of Stanford, but is also open to the general public. The drop-in service is available from 9am to midnight every day, but people can call 24 hours a day, 7 days week.

History 
The Bridge was founded in 1971, under the supervision of Dr. Vincent D'Andrea, a staff psychiatrist at the Cowell Student Health Services, and was originally intended as a confidential drug-counseling center. Over the years, it evolved into a general peer-counseling center.

The name was inspired by the Simon and Garfunkel song "Bridge Over Troubled Water," which had topped the Billboard charts the year before.

Operation 
The Bridge is staffed entirely by undergraduate and graduate student volunteers. The service is anchored by four live-in counselors, who cover the night shifts and take on administrative and mentoring roles.

All counselors take two ten-week courses that cover basic counseling methods and surveys a wide variety of campus health issues. This class is taught by a full-time staff psychologist at Counseling and Psychological Services (CAPS), with the assistance of Bridge counselors.

Every year from 1971 to 2008, The Bridge organized the Stanford Spring Faire, a three-day-long fine arts and crafts fair, to fund itself. Since 2009, the Bridge has received funding through ASSU Special Fees as a registered student group.

Notable alumni 
 Cory Booker, U.S. Senator from New Jersey, 2013-present; Mayor of Newark, 2006-2013
 Peter Salovey, President, Yale University, 2013- ; Chris Argyris Professor of Psychology, Yale University, 1986- ;

References

External links
 The Bridge Peer Counseling Center Website

Stanford University
Counseling organizations